The "hacks and hunter combined", also known as the "chevaux de selle", was an equestrian event at the 1900 Summer Olympics. It is unknown how many riders competed. The top four placers are known, as are about half the remaining riders who competed, including three women (Elvira Guerra, Jane Moulin and Blanche de Marcigny). As an upper limit, 50 men and 1 woman are listed as entrants in the Official Report, but it is almost certain that not all actually competed. 

Sources prior to 1996 often did not list this event as Olympic. The IOC website currently has affirmed a total of 95 medal events, after accepting, as it appears, the recommendation of Olympic historian Bill Mallon regarding events that should be considered "Olympic". These additional events include the hacks and hunter combined event. (Mallon and de Wael had included this event in their Olympic lists.)

Background

No equestrian events were held at the first modern Olympics in 1896. Five events, including this one, were featured in 1900. Only the show jumping competition would ever be held again after that; this was the only appearance of the hacks and hunter combined.

Competition format

The contest consisted of performing both on the flat at various gaits as well as executing two low jumps. Competitors were scored for the quality of the execution of the routine.

Schedule

Results

Sources:

Notes

References

Sources
 International Olympic Committee medal winners database
 De Wael, Herman. Herman's Full Olympians: "Equestrian 1900". Accessed 19 January 2006.
 
 The Schoolmistress: Elvira Guerra-The forgotten female Olympic equestrian.

Jumping